Satyabhama, also known as Satrajiti, is a Hindu goddess and the third queen-consort of the Hindu god Krishna. Satyabhama is described as the incarnation of Bhudevi, the goddess and the personification of the earth. She aided Krishna in defeating the asura Narakasura.

Legend

Marriage to Krishna 

Satyabhama was the daughter of Yadava King Satrajita, the royal treasurer of Dwaraka, who was the owner of the Syamantaka jewel. Satrajit, who secured the jewel from the sun-god Surya and would not part with it even when Krishna, the king of Dvaraka, asked for it saying it would be safe with him. Shortly thereafter, Prasena, the brother of Satrajita, went out hunting wearing the jewel but was killed by a lion. Jambavan, known for his role in the Ramayana, killed the lion and gave the jewel to his daughter Jambavati. When Prasena did not return, there were accusations of Krishna murdering Prasena for stealing the jewel for himself.

Krishna, in order to remove the stain on his reputation, set out with his men in search of the jewel and found it in Jambavan's cave, with his daughter. Jambavan attacked Krishna thinking him to be an intruder who had come to take away the jewel. They fought each other for 28 days, when Jambavan, whose whole body was terribly weakened from the incisions of Krishna's sword, finally recognized him as Rama and surrendered to him.

As repentance for his deeds, Jambavan returned the jewel back to Krishna and requested him to marry his daughter Jambavati. Krishna returned the jewel to Satrajita. He promptly offered to give Krishna the jewel and his daughter Satyabhama, in marriage. Krishna accepted them, but refused the jewel.

Satyabhama, with Krishna, had 10 sons - Bhanu, Swabhanu, Subhanu, Bhanumaan, Prabhanu, Atibhanu, Pratibhanu, Shribhanu, Bruhadbhanu, and Chandrabhanu.

Killing of Narakasura 

Narakasura was a danava tyrant, who captured and governed the city of Pragjothishya, believed in Assamese tradition to be located in the present-day Assam. He gained a boon from Brahma that he would die only in the hands of his mother. Armed with the boon, he ruled like a despot. Narakasura was infamous for his wicked ruling and high disregard for demigods and women. His mother was the earth goddess, Bhudevi. Also, his mother had obtained a boon from Vishnu that her son should die only when she wishes for.

Addicted to power, he defeated Indra and abducted 16,000 women and imprisoned them in his palace. He stole the earrings of Aditi, the heavenly mother Goddess and usurped some of her territories. Upon this the king of the gods Indra requested Krishna to conquer and kill the asura and free Devaloka from his atrocities. At his request, Krishna sieged the city of Narkasura with the assistance of his vehicle, Garuda along with his beloved wife Satyabhama.

A terrible battle ensued between Krishna and Narkasura. Eventually after a great battle, lord Krishna killed Narakasura using his Sudarshan Chakra. Thereafter, Krishna obtained the stolen ear-rings of the mother of the gods, Aditi. Aditi was pleased by Satyabhama's dedication towards her husband and gave her a boon of staying young and beautiful forever. This great day is celebrated as Narak-Chaturdashi which falls in the festival of Deepavali (the first important day of Deepavali).

Krishna's victory against Narakasura translated into freedom for all his prisoners and honouring of Aditi. Having rescued the 16,000 women, Krishna married them to restore them of their honour in society due to being in captivity for a long time. However, the marriage here is only to be viewed as the Lord is more of a saviour of these 16,000 women rather than actually marrying them. It is said that Krishna is only married to eight women and that Rukmini, his first wife and chief consort, stands unique in her devotion and love for Krishna.

Scriptural references 

Seeing Vasudeva in that condition, Satyabhama fanned him with chamaras and Garuda, with his wings. Krishna, finding relief and regaining consciousness, gave Satyabhama his bow Sarnga, which can be wielded in battle only with difficulty due to its great weight, and told her: "Devi, battle now with Naraka. I am suffering and I am tired from the fighting." When Devi Satyabhma was told thus, she, the noble one who always spoke the truth, began to battle with the evil Naraka. Satya, the wife of the wielder of Sarnga, pierced Naraka with sharp narachas, crescent-shaped arrows and with bhallas.”

Mahabharata

In the city of Nirmochana that hero slew six thousand Asuras, and cutting into pieces innumerable keen-edged shafts, he slew Mura and hosts of Rakshasas, and then entered that city. It was there, that an encounter took place between the mighty' Naraka and Vishnu of immeasurable strength. Slain by Krishna, Naraka lay lifeless there, like a Karnikara tree uprooted by the wind. Having slain the Earth's son, Naraka, and also Mura, and having recovered those jewelled ear-rings, the learned Krishna of unparalleled prowess came back, adorned with beauty and undying fame.

KMG Udhyoga Parva chapter 48

Harivamsa

Seeing the trident, decorated with gold, arriving, Krishna of wonderful deeds, split it in two with a sharp edged arrow (Kshurapra). The war with the asura of terrible form (Naraka) became terrible. The war with the great soul naraka was with various weapons. The slayer of Madhu Krishna fought naraka for some time. With his sparkling discus, he(Krishna) cut the terrible naraka in two. His body, split in two by discus fell on the earth, like the peak of a mountain split by the vajra of indra in two parts.

Harivamsa, Vishnu Parva chapter 63

Srimad Bhagavatam

Together with Queen Satyabhama, the Lord mounted His carrier Garuḍa and traveled to the capital of Narakasura's Kingdom. On a field outside the city He decapitated the asura Mura with His disc. Then He fought Mura's seven sons and sent them all to the abode of death, after which Narakasura himself entered the battlefield on the back of an elephant. Naraka threw his sakti lance at Sri Krishna, but the weapon proved ineffective, and the Lord cut the demon's entire army to pieces. Finally, with His sharp-edged disc Krishna cut off Narakasura's head.

Srimad Bhagavatham 10.59

Vishnu Purana

Having slain Mum, Hayagriva, and Pancajana, the wise Hari rapidly reached the city of Pragjyotiṣa: there a fierce conflict took place with the troops of Naraka, in which Govinda destroyed thousands of demons; and when Naraka came into the field, showering upon the deity all sorts of weapons, the wielder of the discus, and annihilator of the asura tribe, cut him in two with his celestial missile. Naraka being slain, Earth, bearing the two earrings of Aditi, approached the lord of the world.

Vishnu Purana, Book 5 chapter 29

Tulabharam 

The legend of the tulabharam is a folktale from Odisha, and is absent in the major scriptures pertaining to Krishna's life. In the tale, Satyabhama is regarded to have prided herself on the love Krishna had for her, and her grasp over his heart. On one contrived occasion, the sage Narada arrived in Dvaraka, and during the course of a conversation, hinted to Satyabhama that the love that Krishna's favourite wife was Rukmini, and not her. Angered by his remark, Satyabhama challenged Narada to prove it. Narada, with his way with words, tricked her into accepting a vrata ritual, where she had to give Krishna away in charity to Narada, and reclaim him by offering the weight of Krishna in wealth. Narada is said to have persuaded her into accepting this vrata by telling her that Krishna's love for her would increase multifold if she succeeded in the tulabharam.

The scene was soon set for the vrata. Satyabhama gave Krishna away in charity, in spite of the other wives' pleadings. Krishna agreed to sit by and watch the proceedings unfold. After donating Krishna to Narada, Satyabhama arranged for a big scale (tula) to be put up, and sent for her huge treasure of gold and jewellery. The scales did not budge. Narada warned her that if she was unable to balance the scales, he would be forced to auction Krishna as a slave to someone else. Satyabhama, in frantic panic, swallowed her pride, and begged all the other wives to give up their jewels. The entire weight of the jewellery of Krishna's wives did not succeed in balancing the scales. In the end, Rukmini was able to resolve the situation by offering a single tulasi leaf upon the other scale, after chanting a prayer, which balanced the scales. This legend is often interpreted to demonstrate that one's devotion matters more than material offerings. While there are different versions in different texts as to why the weighing was arranged, the story of the tulasi leaf placed by Rukmini being worth more in weight than that of Satyabhama's wealth is a common ending.

This episode is also recounted in the Devi Bhagavata Purana:

Satyabhama tied down Hari against a tree and presented Him as a gift to Narada; afterwards she, the passionate woman, freed Krishna on paying an equivalent of gold coins. - chapter 25, book 4, Devi Bhagavata Purana.

Mahabharata 

The Vana Parva, Book 3 of the Mahabharata, shows the friendship between Satyabhama and Draupadi. Krishna and Satyabhama visit Pandavas and Draupadi in the forest of Kamyaka. When the two women were alone, Satyabhama asks several questions of Draupadi about her married life or 'stridharma'. Draupadi, then, advises her and shares the secrets to a content marriage from her experience. Some of the themes which the two women discuss are: family, relationships, respect, work, etc.

In the Ashvamedha Parva, when Bhima arrived in Dvaraka to give the invitation of an ashvamedha to Krishna, Krishna was served by Satyabhama.

Penance 
Satyabhama and few other dear wives of Krishna entered the woods, resolved to set themselves to the practice of penances. They began to live on fruits and roots and pass their time in the contemplation of Hari. Going beyond the Himavat, they took up their abode in a place called Kalpa.

In popular culture

Bhama Kalapam 
'Bhama Kalapam', is a Kuchipudi dance-drama and narrates the story of Satyabhama. Traditionally, each dancer has to perform this piece at least once in their dancing career.
In the olden days only men used to perform Kuchipudi. This tradition has changed and dance includes female performers. In recent times Bhama-daruvu is more common.
In a sequence of the play , the dancer introduces him/herself as Satyabhama and claims that she is the most beautiful and intelligent wife of Lord Krishna. This is known to be the Patra Pravesa Daruvu.

Notes

References

External links

Consorts of Krishna
Hindu goddesses
Characters in the Bhagavata Purana
Characters in the Mahabharata